Hypnaceae is a large family of moss with broad worldwide occurrence in the class Bryopsida, subclass Bryidae and order Hypnales. Genera include Hypnum, Phyllodon, and Taxiphyllum.

Ecology
Some of the family species occur on the floor of Canadian boreal forests; an example of this occurrence is within the black spruce/feathermoss climax forest, often having moderately dense canopy and featuring a forest floor of feathermosses including, Hylocomium splendens, Pleurozium schreberi and Ptilium crista-castrensis.

Classification

The family Hypanaceae includes the following genera: 

Acosta 
Allorgea 
Andoa 
Austrohondaella 
Breidleria 
Bryocrumia 
Bryosedgwickia 
Buckiella 
Callicladium 
Campylophyllum 
Caribaeohypnum 
Ctenidiadelphus 
Ctenidium 
Cupressina 
Cyathothecium 
Dacryophyllum 
Dolichotheca 
Drepanium  
Ectropotheciella 
Ectropotheciopsis 
Ectropothecium 
Entodontella 
Elmeriobryum 
Entodontella 
Eurohypnum 
Filibryum 
Giraldiella 
Glossadelphus 
Gollania 
Herzogiella 
Homomallium 
Hondaella 
Hyocomium 
Hypnum 
Irelandia 
Isopterygium 
Leiodontium 
Macrothamniella 
Microctenidium 
Microthamnium 
Mittenothamnium 
Orthotheciadelphus 
Orthothecium 
Phyllodon 
Platygyriella 
Platygyrium 
Podperaea 
Ptilium 
Puiggariella 
Puiggariopsis 
Pylaisaea 
Pylaisia 
Rhacopilopsis 
Rhizohypnella 
Rhizohypnum 
Stenotheciopsis 
Stereodontopsis 
Taxiphyllopsis 
Taxiphyllum 
Trachythecium 
Tutigaea 
Vesicularia

See also
 Feathermoss

References
 C. Michael Hogan. 2008. Black Spruce: Picea mariana, GlobalTwitcher.com, ed. Nicklas Stromberg
 ITIS Report. 1999. Family: Hypnaceae

Line notes

 
Moss families